Albinaria moreletiana is a species of air-breathing land snail, a terrestrial pulmonate gastropod mollusk in the family Clausiliidae, the door snails. The species is endemic to Crete.

References

Albinaria
Gastropods described in 1878
Taxa named by Oskar Boettger
Endemic fauna of Crete
Molluscs of Europe